Massachusetts House of Representatives' 5th Hampden district in the United States is one of 160 legislative districts included in the lower house of the Massachusetts General Court. It covers the city of Holyoke in Hampden County. Democrat Aaron Vega of Holyoke has represented the district since 2013. Candidates for this district seat in the 2020 Massachusetts general election include Patrick Beaudry and Patricia Duffy.

The current district geographic boundary overlaps with that of the Massachusetts Senate's 2nd Hampden and Hampshire district.

Representatives
 Henry Vose, circa 1858 
 Philo F. Wilcox, circa 1859 
 George W. Gibson, circa 1888 
 Joseph E. King, circa 1920 
 John G. Curley, circa 1951 
 John Pierce Lynch, circa 1951 
 Peter A. Velis, circa 1975 
 Robert Rohan
 Evelyn Chesky
 Michael F. Kane
 Aaron Vega, 2013-current

Former locale
The district previously covered part of Springfield, circa 1872.

See also
 List of Massachusetts House of Representatives elections
 Other Hampden County districts of the Massachusetts House of Representatives: 1st, 2nd, 3rd, 4th, 6th, 7th, 8th, 9th, 10th, 11th, 12th
 Hampden County districts of the Massachusett Senate: Berkshire, Hampshire, Franklin, and Hampden; Hampden; 1st Hampden and Hampshire; 2nd Hampden and Hampshire
 List of Massachusetts General Courts
 List of former districts of the Massachusetts House of Representatives

Images

References

Further reading

External links
 Ballotpedia. Massachusetts House of Representatives Fifth Hampden District
  (State House district information based on U.S. Census Bureau's American Community Survey).

House
Government of Hampden County, Massachusetts